Sarıkemer is a town in the Söke district of Aydın Province, Turkey. The population of Sarıkemer was 2475  as of 2012. The main economic activity of the town is cotton farming. The site of the ancient town of Pyrrha is reputedly located near the town.

References

Populated places in Aydın Province
Towns in Turkey
Söke District